Matthew "Matt" Daly (born 8 July 1983) is an English field hockey player.

Daly made his international debut in 2005. He competed for England and Great Britain at numerous tournaments, including the 2008 and 2012 Summer Olympics.

Daly was born in Saudi Arabia. He has played club hockey for Surbiton and Teddington.

He is currently a senior member of staff and hockey coach at Kingston Grammar School.

References

External links
 

1983 births
Living people
People from Dammam
English male field hockey players
Olympic field hockey players of Great Britain
British male field hockey players
Field hockey players at the 2006 Commonwealth Games
2006 Men's Hockey World Cup players
Field hockey players at the 2008 Summer Olympics
Field hockey players at the 2012 Summer Olympics
Surbiton Hockey Club players
Commonwealth Games competitors for England